Craig Barr (born 29 March 1987) is a Scottish footballer who plays as a defender for Tranent. Barr has previously played for Gretna, Queen of the South, Livingston, Airdrieonians, Raith Rovers and Dumbarton, as well as Swedish club Östersunds FK.

Career

Early years
Born in Edinburgh, Barr moved south as a 16-year-old to join Blackburn Rovers and spent three years with the Lancashire club winning the FA Premier Academy League in 2004–05.

Gretna
Barr played in the early part of his career with Gretna signing for the club when they were bankrolled by Brooks Mileson. He was part of the squad who won the Scottish Football League First Division in the 2006–07 season which earned them promotion into the SPL. In 47 league appearances for Gretna, Barr scored five goals.

Mileson pulled the plug on the club's cashflow when his health deteriorated. The club thus became financially stricken and went into administration. Administrators for Gretna laid off their last 40 staff including Barr on 19 May 2008.

Queen of the South
Barr signed a two-year contract with Dumfries-based First Division side Queen of the South on 26 June 2008.

Just after signing, Barr said "I'm really looking forward to the move. Queens are coming off the back of a fantastic season and I'm excited at the prospect of playing for the Scottish Cup finalists. I know big Neilly MacFarlane, Jamie McQuilken and 'Tosher' from my time at Gretna and also have a lot of respect for ex-Queens player, big Derek Townsley, who I also know well".

Barr played both games in Queen of the South's Uefa Cup Second qualifying round against FC Nordsjælland losing out 4-2 on aggregate.  

After playing over thirty games in his first season with the club, Barr suffered a season-ending injury on his knee during the pre-season of 2009–10. He had two operations on this injury, with the major one being a complete cruciate reconstruction. As Queens refused to pay for the operation, Barr took it upon himself to fund it. Due to this matter, he then spent the last six months of his contract doing his own rehab away from the club. Barr was among the players announced as released by the club at the end of the 2009–10 season.

Livingston
Barr signed for Livingston in August 2010. In his first season, he played a pivotal role in helping the club to win the Second Division title. He subsequently signed a new two-year deal, keeping him at the club until the end of season 2012–13. 

In his second season, he won the end of season Players' Player of the Year award  

Barr left Livingston at the end of the 2012–13 season, following a relatively successful three-year spell with the club making 112 appearances in all competitions.

Östersunds FK
In July 2013, Barr signed for Swedish Superettan club Östersunds FK, then managed by current Chelsea F.C. manager, Graham Potter.

Airdrieonians
On 23 February 2014, Barr returned to Scottish football, signing for Airdrieonians on a contract until the end of the 2013–14 season.

Raith Rovers
In summer 2014, Barr joined Raith Rovers. He left the club in June 2017, following their relegation to Scottish League One.

Dumbarton
Having left Raith, Barr joined Scottish Championship side Dumbarton on a two-year deal in June 2017. He scored his first goal for the club in a 2–1 defeat to Clyde in July 2017. He won the club's Players' Player of the Year award in his first season at the Rock and captained the side on a number of occasions. Barr turned down a new deal and left the club in May 2019 after an injury hit second season.

Cowdenbeath
On 11 June 2019, Barr signed for Scottish League Two club Cowdenbeath. In his first couple of months at the club, Barr was voted as Ladbrokes Player of the Month for September for the whole of League 2. Barr won historic back-to-back awards for the first time since 1952 as he was named Player of the Year and Players' Player of the Year for two consecutive season's in a row.

Tranent
Barr signed for Tranent in 2022.

Career Statistics

References

External links

1987 births
Living people
Footballers from Edinburgh
Scottish footballers
Association football central defenders
Gretna F.C. players
Queen of the South F.C. players
Scottish Premier League players
Scottish Football League players
Scottish Professional Football League players
Superettan players
Livingston F.C. players
Blackburn Rovers F.C. players
Östersunds FK players
Airdrieonians F.C. players
Raith Rovers F.C. players
Dumbarton F.C. players
Cowdenbeath F.C. players
Tranent Juniors F.C. players